The Reda is a river in northern Poland in the Pomeranian Voivodship. It empties into the Bay of Puck, a part of Gdańsk Bay.

The Reda is 45 km long, and drains about 485 square kilometers. It flows within the geographical region of Pobrzeże Kaszubskie; bordering Puszcza Darżlubska (English: Darżlubie Forest, or Darżlubska Wilderness) to the north, and the Tricity Landscape Park (Trójmiejski Park Krajobrazowy) to the south.

Flow of the Reda river
The Reda flows through or near these locations:
Nowy Dwór, Gmina Łęczyce
Strzebielino
Kniewo
Lake Orle
Orle
Bolszewo
Wejherowo
Reda, Poland

Gallery

See also
 
Bolszewka

External links
Delta of Reda River

 
Rivers of Poland
Rivers of Pomeranian Voivodeship